LPB Bank (previously Latvijas Pasta Banka) is a Latvian bank. It was founded on 5 September 2008 and changed its name to LPB Bank on 15 December 2017.  It is joint stock company 100% owned by holding company Mono.

LPB Bank is a member of the Finance Latvia Association, which representing the Latvian financial sector on a national and international level. 

The office of LPB Bank is situated in Riga, Latvia, Brivibas street 54. The bank building was initially intended for the needs of the “Aeroflot” central agency and was built from 1984 to 1991.

Modris Ģelzis, one of the trailblazers in contemporary Latvian architecture, created each façade radically differently. initially, the dominant of the building's centerpiece was a Rubik's cube, counterbalanced by a traditional building element – a nearby wind vane. 

It was named in the investigation into the 2014 Moldovan bank fraud scandal, together with ABLV Bank and PrivatBank It was fined 305,000 Euros for its part in this.

In 2018, it was fined 2.2 million Euros by Latvia's Financial and Capital Market Commission (FKTK), 10% of its turnover, for "continuous non-compliance" with anti-money laundering and counter-terrorist financing legislation. The FCMC said, amongst other issues, that "the Bank failed to give sufficient weight to the unusually large, complex, inter-related transactions that have no apparent economic or visible lawful purpose".

In 2018 the bank submitted to the FCMC a new strategy of the operation foresees the focus of the provision of FinTech services, e-commerce, the banks reorientation from the CIS countries to the EEA, OECD. 

As a bank it states that its priorities are e-commerce, fintech, business finance and brokerage.

References

External links
Bank website

Banks of Latvia